The 2015 World RX of Canada was the seventh round of the second season of the FIA World Rallycross Championship. The event was held at the Circuit Trois-Rivières in Trois-Rivières, Quebec.

Heats

‡ Anton Marklund used a Marklund Motorsport-built Volkswagen Polo this round, as the EKS team were unable to repair his regular Audi S1 in time for shipping following his accident at the previous round.

Semi-finals

Semi-final 1

Semi-final 2

Final

Championship standings after the event

References

External links

|- style="text-align:center"
|width="35%"|Previous race:2015 World RX of Sweden
|width="30%"|FIA World Rallycross Championship2015 season
|width="35%"|Next race:2015 World RX of Norway
|- style="text-align:center"
|width="35%"|Previous race:2014 World RX of Canada
|width="30%"|World RX of Canada
|width="35%"|Next race:2016 World RX of Canada
|- style="text-align:center"

Canada
World RX